Open Horizon is an album recorded by American saxophonist Ken McIntyre in 1975 for the SteepleChase label.

Reception

Allmusic awarded the album 4 stars.

Track listing
All compositions by Ken McIntyre
 "Sister Precious" - 3:53
 "Don't I" - 10:59
 "Daybreak" - 4:12
 "Puunti" - 3:36
 "Open Horizon" - 4:18
 "Jawne" - 6:07
 "Sendai" - 5:33
 "Bee Pod" - 8:08

Personnel 
Ken McIntyre - alto saxophone, flute, bassoon, oboe
Kenny Drew - piano, electric piano
Buster Williams - bass
Andrei Strobert - drums

References 

1976 albums
Makanda Ken McIntyre albums
SteepleChase Records albums